Sylvia Lehmann (born 23 April 1954) is a German politician of the Social Democratic Party (SPD) who has been serving as a member of the Bundestag from the state of Brandenburg since 2019.

Political career 
Between 2004 and 2019 Lehmann was a member of the State Parliament of Brandenburg. 

Lehmann has been a member of the German Bundestag since 3 December 2019, representing the Dahme-Spreewald – Teltow-Fläming III – Oberspreewald-Lausitz I constituency. In that capacity, she serves on the Committee on Home Affairs.

References

External links 

  
 Bundestag biography 

1954 births
Living people
People from Drebkau
People from Bezirk Cottbus
Members of the Bundestag for the Social Democratic Party of Germany
Members of the Bundestag for Brandenburg
Members of the Bundestag 2017–2021
Members of the Bundestag 2021–2025
Female members of the Bundestag
21st-century German women politicians